This is a list of Romanian Air Force and Romanian Air Corps units, past and present.

Squadrons

Active
57th Air Base
861st Fighter Squadron 
572nd Helicopter Squadron
71st Air Base 
711th Fighter Squadron 
712th Helicopter Squadron
713th Combat Helicopter Squadron  
86th Air Base 
53rd Fighter Squadron
862nd Helicopter Squadron 
90th Airlift Base 
901st Strategic Transport Squadron 
902nd Transport and Reconnaissance Squadron 
903rd Transport Helicopter Squadron 
95th Air Base 
951st Advanced Air Training Squadron 
952nd Combat Helicopter Squadron 
Aurel Vlaicu Flight School 
1st Air Training Squadron
2nd Air Training Squadron
142nd Reconnaissance Squadron

WW1

1916
  (1st Squadron Group) - commanded by Cpt. Sturdza, assigned to the Romanian 1st Army. The group had 2 squadrons.
  - commanded by Lt. Pașcanu (replaced by Lt. Negerscu), assigned to the Romanian 2nd Army.  
  - commanded by Cpt. , assigned to the Romanian 3rd Army. The group had 3 squadrons:
 
 
 
  - commanded by Lt. Giossanu, assigned to the Northern Army.

1917
Organization in the summer of 1917 - Order No. 1247/1917
 , with its headquarters at Bacău and commanded by Maj. Alexandru Sturdza, assigned to the 2nd Romanian Army:
 - commanded by Cpt.  (until March), then by Captain Panait Cholet
 - commanded by Cpt. Scarlat Ștefănescu
 - commanded by Cpt. 
 , with its headquarters at Tecuci and commanded by Maj. Andrei Popovici, assigned to the 4th Russian Army (will be re-assigned to the 1st Romanian Army):
 - commanded by Cpt. Haralambie Giossanu
 - commanded by Cpt. André Goulin
 - commanded by Cpt. Maurice Gond
 - commanded by Cpt. Bertrand de Fraguier 
 - commanded by Cpt. Ștefan Protopopescu

 , with its headquarters at Galați and commanded by Cpt. Nicolae Capșa, assigned to the 1st Romanian Army (will be re-assigned to the 6th Russian Army):
 - commanded by Cpt. Radu Irimescu
 - commanded by Cpt. Paul Bléry
 - commanded by Cpt. Armand Délas

1918
From January 1918:
 , commanded by Maj. Athanase Enescu:
 - renamed to  after receiving Sopwith 1½ Strutters
 

 All squadrons of this group were based at Bacău.
 , commanded by Maj. Sever Pleniceanu:
 - with the aerodrome at Bârlad
 - ex-B.M.8
 - at Adjud
 - at Tecuci
, with the headquarters at Roman and commanded by Maj. Haralambie Giossanu:
 - aerodrome at Fălticeni
 - ex-C.12, with the aerodrome at Dorohoi
 - at Botoșani

From February 1918, a new group was formed in Bessarabia:

Hungarian-Romanian War of 1919
 ("5th Aeronautical Group"), with the headquarters at Sibiu and commanded by Major Athanase Enescu:
 - renamed to  after receiving Bréguet 14 aircraft
 - commanded by Lt. Iosif Răcășanu
 - based at Gherla

WW2
Fighter units
1st Fighter Group (Grupul 1 Vânătoare)
41st Fighter Squadron
42nd Fighter Squadron
2nd Fighter Group (Grupul 2 Vânătoare)
45th Fighter Squadron
46th Fighter Squadron
5th Fighter Group (Grupul 5 Vânătoare)
10th Fighter Squadron - 51st Fighter Squadron from October 1939
11th Fighter Squadron - 52nd Fighter Squadron from October 1939
6th Fighter Group (Grupul 6 Vânătoare)
62nd Fighter Squadron
63rd Fighter Squadron
7th Fighter Group (Grupul 7 Vânătoare)
53rd Fighter Squadron
57th Fighter Squadron
8th Fighter Group (Grupul 8 Vânătoare) - 8th Assault Group (Grupul 8 Asalt) from May 1943
59th Fighter Squadron
60th Fighter Squadron
9th Fighter Group (Grupul 9 Vânătoare)
47th Fighter Squadron
48th Fighter Squadron
1st Night Fighter Squadron (Escadrila 1 Vânătoare de Noapte)

Bomber units
1st Bomber Group (Grupul 1 Bombardament)
2nd Bomber Group (Grupul 2 Bombardament)
3rd Bomber/Dive Bomber Group (Grupul 3 Bombardament/picaj)
4th Bomber Group (Grupul 4 Bombardament)
5th Bomber Group (Grupul 5 Bombardament)
6th Bomber / Dive Bomber Group (Grupul 6 Bombardament/picaj)
18th Light Bomber Squadron

Reconnaissance Units
1st Long Range Recon Group (Grupul 1 Recunoaștere Îndepărtată)
1st Guard Group
2nd Guard Group

Transport Units
Air Transport Group (Grupul de Aero-Transport)
105th Transport Squadron
106th Transport Squadron
108th Light Transport Squadron - known as Escadrila Albă ("White Squadron")
109th Glider Transport Squadron		
Liaison Units
111th, 112th, 113th, 115th, 116th Liaison Squadrons (Escadrile de Legătură)

Other units

Aerostation Units
1st Aerostation Company (Compania 1 Aerostație)
2nd, 3rd, 4th, 5th Aerostation Companies

Ground units
1st Surface-to-air Missiles Brigade
11th Surface-to-air Missiles Regiment 
70th Aviation Engineer Regiment 
85th Signal Battalion

External links
Official site of the Romanian Air Force
Order of Battle of the Romanian Air Force
Romanian Royal Aeronautics

Romanian Air Force